Casarano is a town and sixth most populous comune in the Italian province of Lecce, in the Apulia region of South-East Italy. The town's economy is mostly agriculture-based, with olive oil being the main product. The Church of Santa Maria Della Croce is one of the oldest Christian sites in the world.

Twin towns
 Charleroi, Belgium

References

External links
Official website
Website about Casarano 
Website about Casarano's sports

Cities and towns in Apulia
Localities of Salento